Alicornops is an extinct genus of rhinoceros belonging to the subfamily Aceratheriinae. It lived in Eurasia during the Miocene and Pliocene.

Four species are known. Two of them, Alicornops complanatum and Alicornops laogouense were described recently from the Siwaliks of Pakistan.

The type species Alicornops simorrense was a relatively small aceratheriine with a small horn, short tridactyl legs and strongly curved lower incisors.

References

Miocene rhinoceroses
Pliocene rhinoceroses
Miocene mammals of Asia
Miocene mammals of Europe
Pliocene mammals of Asia
Pliocene mammals of Europe
Taxa described in 1979